Steve Okoniewski (born August 22, 1949) is a former American football defensive tackle who played six seasons in the National Football League (NFL) for the Buffalo Bills, Green Bay Packers, and St. Louis Cardinals. He recently retired as principal from Luxemburg-Casco High School located in Luxemburg, Wisconsin and is a volunteer coach with that teams Spartans football program.

References

1949 births
Living people
American football defensive linemen
Buffalo Bills players
Green Bay Packers players
Montana Grizzlies football players
St. Louis Cardinals (football) players
Washington Huskies football players
High school football coaches in Wisconsin
People from Bremerton, Washington
People from Luxemburg, Wisconsin
Players of American football from Washington (state)